Malambo is a 1942 Argentine drama film directed by Alberto de Zavalía and starring Delia Garcés
and Oscar Valicelli.  At the 1943 Argentine Film Critics Association Awards,  screenwriter Hugo Mac Dougall won the  Silver Condor Award for Best Original Screenplay for his work on the film.

It was selected as the ninth greatest Argentine film of all time in a poll conducted by the Museo del Cine Pablo Ducrós Hicken in 1977.

Cast
Delia Garcés
Oscar Valicelli
Orestes Caviglia
Milagros de la Vega
Alberto Bello
Nelo Cosimi
Mariana Martí
Tito Alonso
Lucía Barause
Margarita Burke

References

External links
 

1942 films
1940s Spanish-language films
Argentine black-and-white films
Films directed by Alberto de Zavalía
Argentine drama films
1942 drama films
1940s Argentine films